The 2003 Parramatta Eels season was the 57th in the club's history. Coached by Brian Smith and captained by Nathan Cayless, they competed in the National Rugby League's 2003 Telstra Premiership.

Summary
After reaching the Finals Series every year for the last six years, Parramatta could not make it a 7th year running as they finished 9th in the 2003 Season. Needing to beat runaway Minor Premiers the Penrith Panthers by over 30 points in the final round, the Eels were comprehensively beaten away, signalling the need for changes at the club should they continue to be successful.

Standings

Awards
Michael Cronin clubman of the year award: Dean Widders
Ken Thornett Medal (Players' player): Daniel Wagon
Jack Gibson Award (Coach's award): John Morris
Eric Grothe Rookie of the Year Award: Michael Witt

References

Parramatta Eels seasons
Parramatta Eels season